The scale-eye plaice (Acanthopsetta nadeshnyi) is a flatfish of the family Pleuronectidae. Its native habitat is the northern Pacific, primarily from the Sea of Okhotsk to Japan and Korea, though it is also found in the Bering Sea.

References

Pleuronectidae
Fish described in 1904
Fish of the Pacific Ocean